Charles V may refer to:

 Charles V, Holy Roman Emperor (1500–1558)
 Charles V of Naples (1661–1700), better known as Charles II of Spain
 Charles V of France (1338–1380), called the Wise
 Charles V, Duke of Lorraine (1643–1690)
 Infante Carlos of Spain, Count of Molina (1788–1855), first Carlist pretender to the throne of Spain (as Charles V)

See also
 Karl V (opera)
 Carlos V (chocolate bar)
 King Charles (disambiguation)
 Charles

eo:Karolo (regantoj)#Karolo la 5-a